Stocks are an external framework in a shipyard used to support construction of (usually) wooden ships. They are normally associated with a slipway to allow the ship to slide down into the water. In addition to supporting the ship itself, they are typically used to give access to the ship's bottom and sides.

References 

Shipbuilding